Panyukovo is a rural locality (a village) in Nikolskoye Rural Settlement, Kaduysky District, Vologda Oblast, Russia. The population was 3 as of 2002.

Geography 
Panyukovo is located 38 km northeast of Kaduy (the district's administrative centre) by road. Andronovo is the nearest rural locality.

References 

Rural localities in Kaduysky District